Jaftha v Schoeman and Others, Van Rooyen v Stoltz and Others is an important case in South African law, in particular in the area of civil procedure, with its determination that the execution of immovable property is subject to judicial oversight.

Facts 
The appellants in two cases had had their homes sold in execution for debts of R250 and R190 respectively. The appellants applied in the High Court for orders setting aside the sales and executions, and interdicting two of the respondents from taking transfer of their homes. The basis of the applications was that the sale-in-execution process was unconstitutional.

The High Court dismissed their argument, finding that the applicants could either vacate the premises or remain in occupation. If they chose to stay, the new owners would have to evict them according to in terms of the Prevention of Illegal Eviction from and Unlawful Occupation of Land Act, 1998.

Argument 
On appeal, the applicants claimed

 that their constitutional right to adequate housing was being infringed;
 that the state and private parties should not interfere with this right; and
 that certain assets of a debtor should be protected against execution because without them it would be unduly difficult for the debtor to survive, or would render him permanently homeless.

They argued that words should be read into section 67 of the Magistrates Courts Act, 1944 to prohibit sales in execution against houses below a particular minimum value.

Judgment 
The court held that section 26 of the South African Constitution, guaranteeing the right to housing, needed to be read as a whole. It considered section 26(3), which stated that eviction would not occur without an order of court considering all of the circumstances relevant to the case. Read as a whole, the provision was in place to ensure that the state was striving to provide adequate access to housing for all and refraining from permitting people to be removed unless such could be justified.

Any measure that permitted a person to be deprived of existing access to adequate housing, the court found, may be a justifiable limitation of the section-26 right, in terms of the limitation clause of the Constitution.

The court also considered that the advantage that attached to a creditor who sought execution may be greatly outweighed by the immense prejudice and hardship caused to the debtor.

Section 66(1)(a) of the Magistrates Courts Act, 1944 was so broad, the court found, that it permitted sales in execution of immovable property without judicial intervention, even where they were unjustifiable. This meant that the scheme was overbroad and unconstitutional. To remedy this, the provision was to be read as if the words "a court, after consideration of all relevant circumstances, may order execution" appeared before the words "against the immovable property of the other party."

References 
 Jaftha v Schoeman and Others, Van Rooyen v Stoltz and Others 2005 (2) SA 140 (CC); 2005 (1) BCLR 78 (CC).

Notes 

2004 in South African law
2004 in case law
Constitutional Court of South Africa cases